Ajaan Suwat Suvaco (27 August 19195 April 2002), born in Thailand, was a  Buddhist monk who founded four monasteries in the western United States. Ordained at the age of twenty, he became a student of Ajaan Funn Acaro two or three years later. He also studied briefly with Ajaan Mun.

Following Ajaan Funn's death in 1977, Ajaan Suwat stayed on at the monastery to supervise his teacher's royal funeral and the construction of a monument and museum in Ajaan Funn's honor. In the 1980s Ajaan Suwat came to the United States, where he established his four monasteries: one near Seattle, Washington; two near Los Angeles; and one in the hills of San Diego County (Metta Forest Monastery). He returned to Thailand in 1996, and died in Buriram on 5 April 2002, after a long illness.

External links
Articles by Ajaan Suwat Suvaco
Ajaan Suwat - Index collection of talks and books accesstoinsight.org
Fistful of Sand & The Light of Discernment: Teachings of Phra Ajaan Suwat Suvaco
The Intelligent Heart : Five Dhamma Talks

References

1919 births
2002 deaths
Thai Forest Tradition monks
Thai Theravada Buddhist monks
20th-century Buddhist monks